is a multinational conglomerate corporation headquartered in Minato, Tokyo, Japan, and one of the world's largest media conglomerates.

As of March 2010, Sony has made 92 acquisitions while taking stakes at 56 companies. The company has 83 divestitures since 1983.

Acquisitions

Pending

Stakes

Divestitures

References

Sony
Sony
Sony acquisitions